Valeriy Vasylyovych Malikov (30 March 1942 in Mariupol, Nazi Germany occupation – 31 December 2016) was a Ukrainian statesman, and former Head of the Security Service of Ukraine (1994–1995).

References

External links 
 Biography

1942 births
2016 deaths
Politicians from Mariupol
National University of Kharkiv alumni
Colonel Generals of Ukraine
21st-century Ukrainian politicians
Recipients of the Order of Merit (Ukraine), 3rd class
Directors of the Security Service of Ukraine
Laureates of the Honorary Diploma of the Verkhovna Rada of Ukraine